In signal processing, the polynomial Wigner–Ville distribution is a quasiprobability distribution that generalizes the Wigner distribution function. It was proposed by Boualem Boashash and Peter O'Shea in 1994.

Introduction 

For example, it is important to detect signals of an arbitrary high-order polynomial phase. However, the conventional Wigner–Ville distribution have the limitation being based on the second-order statistics. Hence, the polynomial Wigner–Ville distribution was proposed as a generalized form of the conventional Wigner–Ville distribution, which is able to deal with signals with nonlinear phase.

Definition 

The polynomial Wigner–Ville distribution  is defined as

The above expression for the kernel may be rewritten in symmetric form as

The discrete-time version of the polynomial Wigner–Ville distribution is given by the discrete Fourier transform of

The conventional Wigner–Ville distribution is a special case of the polynomial Wigner–Ville distribution with

Example 

One of the simplest generalizations of the usual Wigner–Ville distribution kernel can be achieved by taking . The set of coefficients  and  must be found to completely specify the new kernel. For example, we set

The resulting discrete-time kernel is then given by

Design of a Practical Polynomial Kernel 

For a practical polynomial kernel , the set of coefficients and should be chosen properly such that

 When ,

 When

Applications 

Nonlinear FM signals are common both in nature and in engineering applications. For example, the sonar system of some bats use hyperbolic FM and quadratic FM signals for echo location. In radar, certain pulse-compression schemes employ linear FM and quadratic signals. The Wigner–Ville distribution has optimal concentration in the time-frequency plane for linear frequency modulated signals. However, for nonlinear frequency modulated signals, optimal concentration is not obtained, and smeared spectral representations result. The polynomial Wigner–Ville distribution can be designed to cope with such problem.

References 

 
 
 “Polynomial Wigner–Ville distributions and time-varying higher spectra,” in Proc. Time-Freq. Time-Scale Anal., Victoria, B.C., Canada, Oct. 1992, pp. 31–34.

Quantum mechanics
Continuous distributions
Concepts in physics
Mathematical physics
Exotic probabilities
Polynomials